The Penthesilea Painter (active between 470 and 450 BC at Athens) was a Greek vase painter of the Attic red-figure style. His true name is unknown. His conventional name is derived from his name vase, "bowl 2688" in Munich, the inside of which depicts the slaying of Penthesilea by Achilles. On the basis of that work, John Beazley attributed 177 known vases to the painter, about 100 of which only survive fragmentarily. Bowls, 149 in number, represent the bulk of his work. The rest is distributed among small shapes like skyphoi, kantharoi and bobbins.

His work is characterised by large, space-filling figures whose posture is often bent so as to permit them to fit on a vessel. For the same reason, ornamental decoration around the edges is often very narrow. His works are also characterised by being very colourful, permitting several intermediate shades. Apart from dark coral red and the usual light red, he also used tones of brown, yellow, yellow-white and gold. His figures are painted remarkably meticulously in every detail. Unlike many of his contemporaries, he appears to have painted the subsidiary or exterior images on his vases himself. An exception is his very early "bowl T 212" at the Museo Archeologico Nazionale in Ferrara, with exterior images by the Splanchnoptes Painter. The Penthesilea Painter's works are dominated by depictions of boys and youths engaged in athletic activity, teaching scenes, weaponry and armour, as well as scenes of people talking to horses. While he painted the occasional mythological motif, they are so rare that they should be considered an exception among his work. Throughout his career, scenes from everyday life gain an increasingly dominant share of his paintings.

In his later works, his love of detail is lost and replaced with stencil-like motifs, their basic compositions indistinguishable from typical mass-produced wares. His lines become more casual, but don't lose their certainty, so that even these works preserve a distinctive charm, marking him as one of the great masters of Greek vase painting. His true mastery is increasingly found in the subsidiary images of boys, on which he appears to have concentrated more and more.

His major importance for Classical vase painting lies in the fact that he moved away from the usual motifs and replaced them with typical motifs from everyday life. His emphasis on human aspects represented a new departure and was to be an important influence on the further development of vase painting.

Apart from the Penthesilea bowl, "bowl 2689", also in Munich, is considered his other masterpiece. Its interior shows the slaying of Tityos by Apollo.

Selected works

Bibliography
Hans Diepolder. Der Penthesilea-Maler. Leipzig 1936. (Bilder griechischer Vasen, 10).
John Beazley. Attic Red Figure Vase Painters. Oxford: Clarendon Press, 1963

External links
 The Perseus Project - Vases by the Penthesilea Painter

5th-century BC deaths
Ancient Greek vase painters
Anonymous artists of antiquity
Ancient Athenians
Year of birth unknown